Play money is noticeably fake bills or coins intended to be used as toy currency, especially for classroom instruction or as an in-game currency in board games such as Monopoly, rather than currency in a legitimate exchange market. Play money coins and bills are collected widely. They can be found made from metals, cardboard or, more frequently today, plastic. For card games such as poker, casino tokens are commonly used instead.

In 1997, the Winston Million (a cash prize award program on the NASCAR Winston Cup Series) was won by Jeff Gordon at the Mountain Dew Southern 500. A Brinks truck led him around the victory lap, spewing bags of Winston play money.

Many online gambling sites offer "play money" games which can be played for freely-obtainable credits. These are usually offered alongside "real money" games. However, some sites also offer software that only offers play money games. Such software is usually downloadable from a parallel .net web address, which can then be advertised to the general public as a non-gambling website.

See also

 Monopoly money

References

External links

Play money – Collins Dictionary

Economics education
Simulation
Game equipment
Educational toys
Money